Talkhu (also Romanized as Talkhū) is a village in Kaki Rural District, Kaki District, Dashti County, Bushehr Province, Iran. At the 2006 census, its population was 651, in 128 families.

References 

Populated places in Dashti County